Barnabas Bidwell (August 23, 1763 – July 27, 1833) was an author, teacher and politician of the late 18th and early 19th centuries, active in Massachusetts and Upper Canada (now Ontario). Educated at Yale, he practised law in western Massachusetts and served as treasurer of Berkshire County. He served in the state legislature as representative and senator, as well as in the United States Congress as spokesman for the administration of Thomas Jefferson. He was effective in defending the administration's positions and passing important legislation, and was the Massachusetts Attorney General from 1807 to 1810, when exaggerated press accounts of irregularities in the Berkshire County books halted his political career and prompted his flight to Upper Canada. Bidwell later paid the $63.18, plus fines, which he attributed to a Berkshire County clerk while he was away on duties in Boston. Nonetheless, the controversy, exaggerated in the press by his Federalist Party enemies, effectively scuppered his potential appointment to the U.S. Supreme Court.

In Upper Canada, he won a seat in the provincial assembly but his political opponents managed to expel him on charges of having his American citizenship, being a fugitive and having immoral character.

Early life
Bidwell was son of American Revolutionary War Patriot Adonijah Bidwell, Yale 1740, and Jemima Devotion in Township No. 1 (now Monterey, Massachusetts), and he graduated from Yale College in 1785. Through his mother, he was descended from John Haynes, 5th Governor of Massachusetts and 1st Governor of Connecticut, and George Wyllys, 4th Governor of Connecticut. He later attended the College in the English Colony of Rhode Island and Providence Plantations (now known as Brown University) in Providence, Rhode Island. He studied law under judge Theodore Sedgwick of Stockbridge, Massachusetts. Sedgwick, a prominent member of the House of Representatives and later a senator, was an important spokesman for the Federalist Party. He was admitted to the Massachusetts state bar in 1805 and commenced practice in Stockbridge, Massachusetts.

US political career
Bidwell broke with the Federalists and became the leading spokesman of the Democratic-Republican administration of President Thomas Jefferson in the US Congress.

Bidwell was a Massachusetts state senator from 1801 to 1804 and a member of the Massachusetts House of Representatives from 1805 to 1807. Bidwell was elected as a Democratic-Republican and served in the  Ninth and  Tenth Congresses (March 4, 1805 – July 13, 1807).

In the House of Representatives, Bidwell displaced John Randolph of Roanoke, as administration leader and become the leading spokesman of Jefferson. He successfully defended the president's policy of imposing economic sanctions in response to British violations of neutral rights at sea. He also directed the campaign to purchase Florida and was the leading advocate for passage of the bill that abolished the slave trade in the US, which took effect in 1808. He was Attorney General of Massachusetts (June 15, 1807 – August 30, 1810), when his political opponents found in a minor discrepancy in the Berkshire County books and so exaggerated allegations of corruption.

Accused of embezzling money while he was Berkshire County treasurer, he and his family fled to Upper Canada (now Ontario) in 1810 and settled in Kingston until an investigation could determine what if any liability he held. The charge was forwarded by his political enemies in the Federalist Party, apparently to halt his rise of this Democratic-Republican and trusted confidant of Jefferson. At the time, he has been under consideration by President James Madison for a position on the US Supreme Court. The final judgment of the Berkshire court against him, which he paid in 1817, amounted to only $330.64 damages and a paltry $63.18 costs. Since Bidwell was promptly able to pay both amounts, it was not because of the judgment that he fled. There is little reason, moreover, to doubt his assertion that because his public offices required his presence elsewhere in the United States, he employed clerks to handle his duties in Berkshire, one of whom, who has died by the time of financial exposure, had been responsible. He fled, he claimed, out of fear of his political enemies, who were exaggerating his personal responsibility and indebtedness.

Exile
Bidwell won a seat in the Legislative Assembly of Upper Canada for Lennox and Addington but failed to take his seat because his election was petitioned against on the grounds that he was a fugitive from justice, he had an immoral character, and he had taken an oath of allegiance to the United States. John Beverley Robinson and Henry John Boulton paid for an investigation into Bidwell's career in the United States to discredit Bidwell's character. The investigation was published in The Kingston Chronicle and Bidwell proved that all the charges against him in the United States had been settled. After an unusually long debate, Bidwell was expelled from the House by a vote of 17-16. 
 
Bidwell remained in Upper Canada until his death at Bath.  His remains are interred in Kingston's Cataraqui Cemetery.

Legacy

His son, Marshall Spring Bidwell, successfully sat in the same seat from 1824 to 1836. Marshall Spring Bidwell later left for the United States. Bidwell's sister, Theodosia Bidwell Brewer, was the grandmother of U.S. Supreme Court Justice David J. Brewer, who sat on the court from 1889 to 1910 with his uncle, Stephen J. Field.

Footnotes

External links 
 
 Biography at the Dictionary of Canadian Biography Online
Marshall Spring Bidwell family fonds, Archives of Ontario

1763 births
1833 deaths
Massachusetts Attorneys General
Members of the Legislative Assembly of Upper Canada
Massachusetts state senators
Members of the Massachusetts House of Representatives
People from Stockbridge, Massachusetts
People from Lennox and Addington County
American emigrants to pre-Confederation Ontario
Yale College alumni
Democratic-Republican Party members of the United States House of Representatives from Massachusetts
County treasurers in Massachusetts
Immigrants to Upper Canada
People from Berkshire County, Massachusetts